Women & Songs 12 is the 12th album of the Women & Songs franchise.

Overview
Released on November 25, 2008, the current installment of Women & Songs packs another 19 tracks from female artists or groups.  Kreesha Turner, Amy Winehouse, Nelly Furtado, and Sarah Slean all grace the album with music.

Track listing
 I Kissed A Girl [3:00]
(performed by Katy Perry)
 Just Dance (Feat. Colby O'Donis) [4:02]
(performed by Lady Gaga)
 Little Bit Of Red [3:30]
(performed by Serena Ryder)
 Mercy [3:40]
(performed by Duffy)
 Tears Dry On Their Own [3:06]
(performed by Amy Winehouse)
 American Boy [4:04]
(performed by Estelle)
 Damaged [4:06]
(performed by Danity Kane)
 Don't Call Me Baby [3:22]
(performed by Kreesha Turner)
 Until I Say [3:36]
(performed by Jully Black)
 Lay It On The Line [3:40]
(performed by Divine Brown)
 Let's Go [3:05]
(performed by Suzie McNeil)
 Carolyne [3:19]
(performed by Melanie C)
 Teardrops On My Guitar [3:34]
(performed by Taylor Swift)
 Bubbly [3:16]
(performed by Colbie Caillat)
 Where I Stood [4:15]
(performed by Missy Higgins)
 In God's Hands [4:10]
(performed by Nelly Furtado)
 Get Home [3:41]
(performed by Sarah Slean)
 Almost Lover [4:29]
(performed by A Fine Frenzy)
 I Know [2:53]
(performed by Meaghan Smith)

References
 Women & Songs 12 at MusicMuzik 

2008 compilation albums